Melvin Hoover (born September 21, 1959) is a former American football wide receiver who played in the National Football League (NFL).

Early life and high school
Hoover was born and grew up in Charlotte, North Carolina and attended North Mecklenburg High School, where he played basketball and football.

College career
Hoover was a member of the Arizona State Sun Devils for four seasons. He was the team's leading kick returner as a freshman and as a sophomore and was named Arizona State's most improved player as a junior.

Professional career
Hoover was drafted in the sixth round of the 1981 NFL Draft by the New York Giants, but was cut during training camp. Hoover was signed by the Philadelphia Eagles on May 18, 1982 and played three seasons with the team. Hoover was cut during the 1985 preseason after he was unable to agree a new contract with Eagles new owner Norman Braman. Hoover did not play during the 1985 and 1986 seasons but was signed by the Detroit Lions as a replacement player during the 1987 NFL players strike, playing in two games and was released when the strike ended. Hoover finished his NFL career with 16 receptions for 364 yards and two touchdowns in 34 games played.

References

1957 births
Living people
American football wide receivers
Arizona State Sun Devils football players
Players of American football from Charlotte, North Carolina
Philadelphia Eagles players
New York Giants players
Detroit Lions players
National Football League replacement players